Stutton can refer to:

 Stutton, North Yorkshire
 Stutton, Suffolk